Elkan Bauer was an Austrian composer and friend and contemporary of Johann Strauss II born in Nikolsburg, on April 4, 1852.

Biography
Despite being unable to neither read nor write music, he whistled melodies which were then transcribed and performed in the outdoor kiosks of Vienna. After being taken prisoner by the Germans in 1942, the Nazis burned all his possessions including his house, his documents and his scores. He was killed in the concentration camp of Theresienstadt at the age of ninety, on September 20, 1942. Miraculously, thanks to a cousin, who had fled with his family to England before the Kristallnacht, there survived two scores of his unpublished musical waltz ("Aeroplane waltz" and "Diana waltz"). The writer Elisa Springer, his maternal granddaughter, who wrote a book, Das Schweigen der Lebenden (The Silence of the Living), preserved these scores.

References

External links 
 MP3 recording of Diana Waltz

19th-century classical composers
20th-century classical composers
Austrian classical composers
People from Mikulov
Austrian people who died in the Theresienstadt Ghetto
1852 births
1942 deaths
Whistlers
Austrian male classical composers
19th-century Austrian male musicians
20th-century Austrian composers
20th-century Austrian male musicians
Austrian people executed in Nazi concentration camps